Daniel John William Wootton (born 2 March 1983) is a New Zealand born British journalist and broadcaster. He is based in the United Kingdom and holds both New Zealand and British citizenship. He was executive editor of The Sun newspaper.

In 2007, he joined the News of the World. In 2013, he joined The Sun on Sunday and became editor of the Bizarre column the following year. In February 2016, he joined The Sun, under the editorship of Victoria Newton, as associate editor and in March 2018 progressed to executive editor. In 2021 Wootton left News UK to join MailOnline as a columnist and present a show on GB News.

Wootton has made appearances as a show business presenter on the ITV Breakfast shows Lorraine and Daybreak. From 2015 to 2018, he was also a regular contributor and panelist on Big Brother's Bit on the Side.

Early life
Daniel John William Wootton was born in Wellington, New Zealand on 2 March 1983 to two British parents; his mother was born in Basildon, Essex and his father was born on a British army base in Malta. Wootton grew up in Lower Hutt, a city in the Wellington region of New Zealand and attended Naenae College and Victoria University of Wellington, where he obtained a Bachelor of Arts degree in media studies and political science.

Career
He started his career as a journalist in his native New Zealand, writing an entertainment column for the Wellington-based broadsheet newspaper The Dominion Post and was also a reporter for the daily television show Good Morning. He moved to the United Kingdom when he was 21, and after a period working for trade magazines, he found a job with Broadcast magazine.

Wootton joined the News of the World TV team in February 2007, becoming TV editor in November 2007, and show-business editor in November 2008 until its closure in July 2011, when he then became a columnist and feature writer for the Daily Mail and editor-at-large for Now magazine. He later testified to the Leveson Inquiry in 2012 about the News International phone hacking scandal, where he denied illegally publishing stories collected through phone hacking while editor at the News of the World.

In 2013, Wootton joined The Sun newspaper launching a new column on Sundays. He became editor of the newspaper's Bizarre column in 2014, and was promoted to associate editor (showbiz and TV) in 2016. He was named 'Showbiz reporter of the year' at the 2010, 2013 and 2018 British Press Awards. Wootton also made appearances as a showbiz reporter on ITV's morning show Lorraine between 2011 and 2019, and has been a guest on BBC Radio 5 Live.

In 2015, Wootton and The Sun received widespread criticism for an article he penned for the newspaper titled "Hollywood HIV Panic". HIV policy adviser Lisa Power called it "vile" and expressed disappointment that Wootton had "lent his name to such a shameful piece", saying that it reinforced stigma against people with HIV. British HIV charity the Terrence Higgins Trust called it "irresponsible", and The BMJ, a peer-reviewed medical trade journal, also criticised Wootton's article.

Wootton hosted a weekly talkRADIO show called Dan's Dilemmas from March 2018 and, in February 2020, he took over as host of the station's drivetime show, replacing Eamonn Holmes.

Wootton has been credited with breaking the story about Megxit in The Sun on 8 January 2020, which prompted Prince Harry and Meghan, the Duke and Duchess of Sussex, to issue an announcement within hours, confirming their plans for stepping back from their royal duties. Wootton stated that he had been in contact with the couple's spokesperson on 28 December and gave them a ten days' notice before the story broke out, despite facing pressure from royal officials not to run the piece. Sources close to the couple later spoke to The New York Times, stating that they "felt forced to disclose their plans prematurely" as they learned about The Suns intentions to publish the story. Wootton disputed the claim as "They released the statement after we had published the story and had so much notice." In June 2020, it was reported that Harry's lawyers had issued a 'letter before action', threatening to sue Dan Wootton and The Sun, based on allegations that they had paid money to associates of palace officials to secure their stories. Wootton's lawyers denied that any payments were made unlawfully to a public official or a proxy and described the claims as "a smear campaign by unknown bad actors." Prince Harry later said that he believed Wootton was able to publish the story due to "the strength of his secret relationship with one particularly close friend of Willy's comms secretary – who fed him trivial (and mostly fake) gossip."

In July 2020, libel proceedings, brought by Johnny Depp against Wootton and News Group Newspapers, began in the High Court of Justice in the case of Depp v News Group Newspapers Ltd. The action related to an article published in 2018 in The Sun describing Depp as a "wife beater". On 2 November 2020, the court ruled in favour of News Group. Mr Justice Nicol found that assaults were proven to the civil standard in 12 of the 14 incidents reported by Amber Heard, and he concluded that The Sun article was substantially accurate on the balance of probabilities.

In January 2021, Wootton announced that he would leave The Sun and talkRADIO to become a columnist for MailOnline and present a daily show, four days a week, on GB News. In November 2021, his GB News programme, Tonight Live with Dan Wootton, was rebranded to Dan Wootton Tonight and shortened to two hours.

In October 2020, Labour MP Chris Bryant described Wootton as "a nutcase – you're a complete and utter nutcase and you're dangerous as well, a dangerous conspiracy theorist" after Wootton advocated for the Great Barrington Declaration and suggested that herd immunity could be a solution for COVID-19.

Personal life
In 2013, Wootton announced on his Twitter account that he is gay.

In February 2022, Andrew Brady, a former Apprentice contestant and ex-fiancé of Caroline Flack, was jailed for four months for harassing Wootton and making false accusations of sexual offences against him.

References

External links 
 
 Dan on Lorraine

1983 births
Living people
English male journalists
English gay men
New Zealand gay men
New Zealand journalists
New Zealand columnists
New Zealand editors
New Zealand magazine editors
News of the World people
New Zealand expatriates in England
People from Lower Hutt
People educated at Naenae College
Victoria University of Wellington alumni
English LGBT journalists
New Zealand LGBT journalists
English LGBT broadcasters
Gay journalists
GB News newsreaders and journalists
21st-century English LGBT people
21st-century New Zealand LGBT people